Facundo Rodríguez Calleriza (born 20 August 1995) is a Uruguayan footballer who plays for Boston River.

Career

Club
In August 2017, Rodríguez joined Sandefjord on loan.

Career statistics

References

1995 births
Living people
Uruguayan footballers
Uruguayan expatriate footballers
Eliteserien players
Peñarol players
Sud América players
Boston River players
Sandefjord Fotball players
Chacarita Juniors footballers
Argentine Primera División players
Uruguayan Primera División players
Association football forwards
Expatriate footballers in Norway
Expatriate footballers in Argentina
Uruguayan expatriate sportspeople in Norway
Uruguayan expatriate sportspeople in Argentina